Pagophagy or pagophagia is eating of ice.

The term has the two major usages: 
 pagophagia : an eating disorder, a particular case of pica
 normal feeding behavior of some animals

The pagophagic disorder is among the unexplained clinical signs of iron deficiency anemia.

See also
List of abnormal behaviours in animals

References

Eating disorders
Water ice